Hirotoki (written: 宏時 or 煕時) is a masculine Japanese given name. Notable people with the name include:

 (1279–1315), Japanese noble
 (born 1978), Japanese rugby union player

Japanese masculine given names